CeCe Winans is the eponymous fifth studio album by American singer CeCe Winans. It was released by WellSpring Gospel and Sparrow Records on June 19, 2001 in the United States. The album adopted a more urban flair to it with a mixture of pop, R&B, and hip hop.

Critical reception

Allmusic editor Ashleigh Kittle wrote that "upbeat, energy-filled, and enthusiastic, the project is not only musically diverse but offers hard-hitting messages. The song "It's Gonna Get Better" was written with teen suicide prevention programs in mind, while "Bring Back the Days of Yea and Nay," a duet with brother Marvin Winans, challenges parents to take responsibility for training their children. A definite highlight on the album is the song "Looking Back at You." It is an inspirational track, leaning toward a ballad, that speaks of God's unfailing and unconditional love."

Track listing

Notes
  denotes a co-producer

Charts

Certifications

References

CeCe Winans albums
2001 albums
Grammy Award for Best Pop/Contemporary Gospel Album